Niekerk is a village in Westerkwartier municipality also in the Dutch province of Groningen. It had a population of around 1,365 in 2021.

History 
The village was first mentioned in 1392 as "to der Nyerkerke", and means "new church". Nie (new) has been added to distinguish between Oldekerk. Niekerk is a road village which developed on a sandy ridge in a raised bog. During the Late Middle Ages, it started to overshadow neighbouring Oldekerk.

The Dutch Reformed church dates from around 1200. The tower was added in the 13th century. Between 1964 and 1967, it was restored, the plaster was removed and nave was returned to its original shape.

Niekerk was home to 440 people in 1840. It used to be part of the municipality of Oldekerk. In 1990, it became part of Grootegast and was merged into Westerkwartier in 2019.

Gallery

References 

Westerkwartier (municipality)
Populated places in Groningen (province)